Marmorana is a genus of air-breathing land snails, terrestrial pulmonate gastropod mollusks in the subfamily Murellinae of the family Helicidae.

Anatomy
Species within this genus create and use love darts as part of their mating behavior.

Taxonomy 
Marmorana is paraphyletic.

Species 
Species within the genus Marmorana include:
Marmorana fuscolabiata (Rossmässler, 1842)
Marmorana globularis (Philippi, 1836)
 † Marmorana majoris (De Stefani, 1880) 
Marmorana melitensis  (A. Férussac, 1821)
Marmorana muralis  (O. F. Müller, 1774)
Marmorana nebrodensis (O. F. Müller, 1774)
Marmorana platychela  (Menke, 1830)
 † Marmorana sabina (Tuccimei, 1889)
Marmorana saxetana (Paulucci, 1886)
Marmorana scabriuscula (Deshayes, 1832)
Marmorana serpentina (A. Férussac, 1821) - type species
Marmorana sicana 
Marmorana signata (A. Férussac, 1821)

References 

 Bank, R. A. (2017). Classification of the Recent terrestrial Gastropoda of the World. Last update: July 16th, 2017.

Helicidae
Gastropod genera